Vladimir Aytov (born 12 April 1996) is a Bulgarian footballer who currently plays as a defender for Montana.

Career

Early career
Aytov was loaned to Rakovski, playing in the B Group during 2013–14 season.

Botev Plovdiv
Aytov made his A Group debut on 27 June 2014. He was included in the starting lineup for a 1–1 draw against Beroe Stara Zagora. On 30 October 2015, Aytov was included in the starting lineup of Botev Plovdiv for the first time in his career but his team was defeated with 2–0 by Slavia Sofia.

In January 2016 Aytov's contract was terminated by mutual agreement and he left Botev Plovdiv.

Oborishte
After the relegation to Dobrudzha Dobrich, Aytov signed with the other Second League team of Oborishte. He made his debut for the team in the league on 6 August 2016 scoring a goal for the 1:1 draw against Pomorie.

Montana
On 24 June 2017, Aytov signed a 2-year contract with Montana.

International career

Youth levels
On 8 June 2017 he made his debut for Bulgaria U21 in a friendly match against Georgia U21 scoring also his debut goal for the 1:0 win.

Career statistics

References

External links
 

1996 births
Living people
Footballers from Plovdiv
Bulgarian footballers
Bulgaria youth international footballers
Bulgaria under-21 international footballers
Association football defenders
First Professional Football League (Bulgaria) players
Second Professional Football League (Bulgaria) players
Botev Plovdiv players
PFC Dobrudzha Dobrich players
FC Oborishte players
FC Montana players